The 2008–09 Saudi Professional League was the 33rd season of Saudi Professional League since its establishment in 1976. Al-Hilal were the defending champions, having won their 11th title in the previous season. The campaign began on 13 September 2008 and ended on 12 April 2009. A total of 12 teams contested the league, 10 of which already contested in the 2007–08 season, and two of which were promoted from the First Division.

On 12 April 2009, in the final round of the season, Al-Ittihad won the title after a 2–1 victory over Al-Hilal. It was their eighth league title overall. Al-Ittihad, Al-Hilal, Al-Ahli and Al-Shabab all secured a berth for the 2010 AFC Champions League, while Al-Nassr and Al-Ettifaq qualified for the 2009–10 Gulf Club Champions Cup. Al-Watani and Abha were relegated to the First Division.

Changes

Professional League rebrand
On 26 May 2008, the Saudi FF announced that league would be rebranded and would be known as the Saudi Professional League. The changes were based on the criteria introduced by AFC President Mohammed bin Hammam to improve the football standards in Asia. The changes also included a website dedicated to recording statistics of the league for the first time. It was also announced that the website would be run by the Saudi Professional League rather than the Saudi FF.

Qualification and Prize money
The League champions, runners-up and third place as well as the winner of the King Cup of Champions qualified for the 2010 AFC Champions League.

The top eight teams qualified for King Cup of Champions.

Prize money:

 First place: 2.5 million Saudi Riyals
 Second place: 1.5 million Saudi Riyals
 Third place: 1 million Saudi Riyals

Teams
Twelve teams competed in the league – the top ten teams from the previous season and the two teams promoted from the First Division. The promoted teams were Al-Raed (returning to the top flight after an absence of five years) and Abha (returning to the top flight after an absence of two years). They replaced Al-Tai (after seven consecutive years in the top-flight) and Al-Qadisiyah (after six consecutive years in the top-flight).

Stadiums and locations

Personnel

Managerial changes

Foreign players
The number of foreign players was limited to 3 per team, and should not be a goalkeeper. For the January transfer window, the SAFF added an additional slot for a player from one of the AFC countries.

Players name in bold indicates the player is registered during the mid-season transfer window.

League table

Fixtures and results

Relegation play-offs
Al-Raed, who finished 10th, faced Abha, who finished 11th for a two-legged play-off. The winner on aggregate score after both matches earned entry into the 2009–10 Professional League while the loser was relegated to the First Division. Al-Raed won 4–3 on aggregate and retained their place in the next edition.

First leg

Second leg

Al-Raed won 4–3 on aggregate.

Season statistics

Scoring

Top scorers

Hat-tricks 

Notes
4 Player scored 4 goals(H) – Home team(A) – Away team

Most assists

Clean sheets

Discipline

Player 
 Most yellow cards: 6
 Abdullah Al-Dossari (Al-Wehda)
 Ahmed Al-Fraidi (Al-Hilal)
 Taisir Al-Jassim (Al-Ahli)
 Ibrahim Al-Kaabi (Al-Watani)
 Basem Al-Sherif (Al-Raed)
 Harison (Al-Ahli/Al-Wehda)
 Ibrahim Hazzazi (Al-Ahli)
 Abdullah Huwais (Al-Watani)
 Ahmed Menawer (Al-Hazem)

 Most red cards: 2
 Sultan Al-Balawi (Al-Watani)
 Naif Al-Qadi (Al-Shabab)
 Redha Tukar (Al-Ittihad)

Club 
 Most yellow cards: 52
 Abha
 Al-Watani

 Most red cards: 7
 Al-Wehda

Awards
The following awards were given following the conclusion of the season. The awards were known as the Arriyadiyah and Mobily Awards for Sports Excellence and were sponsored by Saudi newspaper Arriyadiyah and Saudi telecommunication company Mobily. The awards were presented on 30 May 2009.

See also
 2009 King Cup of Champions
 2008–09 Saudi Crown Prince Cup

References

External links
 Saudi Arabia Football Federation

Saudi Professional League seasons
2008–09 in Saudi Arabian football
Saudi Professional League